Bret is a male given name, which derives from Breton, a person from Brittany in France. 

People so named include:
Bret Anderson (born 1974), Canadian football player
Bret Baier (born 1970), American journalist
Bret Bergmark (born 1973), American mixed martial artist
Bret Bielema (born 1970), American football coach
Bret Blevins (born 1960), American comic book artist
Bret Boone (born 1969), American baseball player
Bret Cooper (born 1970), American football player
Bret Easton Ellis (born 1964), American writer
Bret Gilliam, American diver
Bret Haaland (born 1959), American animator
Bret Harrison (born 1982), American actor 
Bret Hart (born 1957), Canadian-American wrestler
Bret Harte (1836-1902), American author
Bret Hedican (born 1970), American ice hockey player
Bret Iwan (born 1982), American voice actor
Bret Anthony Johnston (born 1972), American writer
Bret Loehr (born 1993), American actor
Bret McKenzie (born 1976), New Zealand musician and actor
Bret Myers (born 1980), American soccer player and professor
Bret Michaels (born 1963), American singer
Bret Morrison (1912-1978), American actor 
Bret Saberhagen (born 1964), American baseball player
Bret Schundler (born 1959), American politician 
Bret Stephens (born 1973), American journalist
Bret Thornton (born 1983), Australian football player

Fictional characters with the given name include:
Bret Leather, in the comic book series Planetary
Bret Maverick, in the television series Maverick and subsequent movies
Bret Rensselaer, in several spy novels by Len Deighton

See also
Brett
Brent

English-language masculine given names
Masculine given names
English given names